Anna Kristin Hammarström (born 29 March 1982), born in Glanshammar, Sweden, is a former football goalkeeper who played for KIF Örebro DFF and Kopparbergs/Göteborg FC of the Swedish Damallsvenskan. She represented Sweden women's national football team at the 2011 FIFA Women's World Cup. She is the twin sister of fellow national team footballer Marie Hammarström.

In November 2013 both sisters announced their immediate retirement from football. A year later, after the birth of her first child, Hammarström was reportedly in talks with Sweden coach Pia Sundhage about a playing comeback.

References

External links 
 
 

Swedish women's footballers
1982 births
Living people
Sweden women's international footballers
2011 FIFA Women's World Cup players
Swedish twins
Twin sportspeople
KIF Örebro DFF players
Damallsvenskan players
BK Häcken FF players
People from Örebro Municipality
Women's association football goalkeepers
2007 FIFA Women's World Cup players
Sportspeople from Örebro County